Meinhardt might refer to:

Surname
Sven Meinhardt (born 1971), German former field hockey forward
Gerek Meinhardt (born 1990), American foil fencer

First name
Meinhardt Schomberg, 3rd Duke of Schomberg (1641–1719), general in the service of Prince William of Orange
Meinhardt Raabe (1915–2010), American actor

See also
 Mainard
 Maynard (given name)
 Meinhard (disambiguation)

Germanic masculine given names
German-language surnames
Surnames from given names